Robert G. Grant (born 1936) is an American political activist, and the former leader of several Christian right groups in the United States.  He is considered by many the "father" of the Christian Right in the US. He served as the chairman of Christian Voice, "the nation’s oldest conservative Christian lobby", and the American Freedom Coalition.

Early life
Grant earned a B.A. in History from Wheaton College, Wheaton, Illinois; Bachelor of Divinity and Master of Divinity from Fuller Theological Seminary in Pasadena, California; and Doctor of Philosophy from the California Graduate School of Theology. He was also awarded a diploma from the St. Paul Bible College in St. Paul, Minnesota.

Political activism
Concerned about what he saw as moral decay in America, Grant founded American Christian Cause in Southern California in 1974 to fight against pornography and homosexual rights. In 1978, he relocated to Washington, D.C. and founded Christian Voice, the first major Christian Right organization in America. Grant quickly built Christian Voice, recruiting over 107,000 dues paying members including nearly 37,000 pastors. Grant involved national conservative leaders in his movement, including Gary Jarmin, Howard Phillips, Terry Dolan, and Richard Viguerie. Christian Voice-backed candidates included Ronald Reagan, Steve Symms, Dan Quayle, and John East defeated incumbents in the 1978 and 1980 elections.

Grant's group campaigned for the election of President Ronald Reagan in the 1980 presidential election. After Phillips, Dolan, and Viguerie left several years later, they and Jerry Falwell formed a new Christian right organization, the Moral Majority.  Similar groups subsequently founded included Concerned Women for America, American Coalition for Traditional Values, and the Christian Coalition. Grant was the founding president of the American Freedom Coalition with Ralph David Abernathy. He is currently on the board of governors of the Council for National Policy.

Media work
Grant appeared on 60 Minutes, Nightline, CBS, NBC News, the Morton Downey, Jr. Show, Good Morning America, CBS Nightwatch and various local and national radio and television talk shows.  He has been quoted in Time, Newsweek, U.S. News & World Report, Washington Post, Christianity Today, and other publications.

Grant has also worked as a radio talk show host, as the co-host of the television talk show Let Freedom Ring, and on the publisher's council of Conservative Digest Magazine, and is the publisher of American Freedom Journal.

Pastoral work
Grant is an ordained Baptist minister. He has worked in various ministerial positions, as the religion editor of The Washington Times, and has led over 125 pilgrimages to Israel. He was the founder of the California Graduate School of Theology. He is a member of the Religious Roundtable. He was a founding chairman Coalition for Religious Freedom and the American Coalition for Traditional Values, both with Tim Lahaye. He founded the United Community Church of Glendale, California.

Awards and recognition
 Shalom Award, Nation of Israel

References

External links
 

1936 births
Leaders of Christian parachurch organizations
Fuller Theological Seminary alumni
Living people
California Republicans
New Right (United States)